Cheshmeh Soltan (also Romanized as Cheshmeh Solţān; also known as Cheshmeh Solţār) is a village in Pachehlak-e Gharbi Rural District, in the Central District of Azna County, Lorestan Province, Iran. At the 2006 census, its population was 260, in 57 families.

References 

Towns and villages in Azna County